Pass Me the Mic is Taiwanese Mandopop artist Will Pan's second Mandarin studio album.  It was released by Universal Music Taiwan on 19 September 2003. A second edition was released containing a VCD with live in concert tracks.

The track "愛上未來的你" (Love The Future You) is listed at number 50 on Hit Fm Taiwan's Hit Fm Annual Top 100 Singles Chart (Hit-Fm年度百首單曲) for 2003.

Track listing

Bonus VCD
VCD - live in concert highlights
 "我的麥克風" (Pass Me the Mic)
 "Kiss Me 123"

Notes

References

External links
  Will Pan discography@Universal Music Taiwan

2003 albums
Will Pan albums
Universal Music Taiwan albums